Jalgpalliklubi Tallinna Kalev ladies' team is an Estonian women's association football club from Tallinn. The club currently plays in Naiste Meistriliiga, the first level in the Estonian women's football system.

The club has placed second in the league and lost in the Estonain Cup final, but has won the Supercup.

Current squad
Squad for the 2023 season.

Honours
 Naiste Meistriliiga
 Runner-up (1): 2020
 Estonian Women's Cup
 Runner-up (3): 2017, 2020, 2022
 Estonian Women's Supercup
 Winners (1): 2021

References

Women's football clubs in Estonia
Football clubs in Tallinn